The North Queensland Guardian was a newspaper published from Townsville, in the Australian state of Queensland between 1937 and 1943. The newspaper was published by the Queensland State Committee of the Communist Party of Australia. Fred Paterson was the chairman of the editorial board of the newspaper.

Founding
The first issue was published on May Day 1937. The first editorial of the newspaper stated that The North Queensland Guardian would launch "...a crusade against poverty; a crusade against war; a crusade against governmental tyranny and despotism".

Profile
The North Queensland Guardian was the first communist newspaper in the state with a degree of success. Under Paterson's editorship the hammer and sickle was removed from the front page of the newspaper. Unlike other Communist Party of Australia organs, The North Queensland Guardian carried commercial advertisements. It carried articles on sports and social events, dedicating significant attention to women's activities. By May 1937 the newspaper reached a circulation of 5,100 copies. It was sold at two pence per issue.

Murri issue
In 1938 the newspaper condemned the moves to displace the Murri people and confiscate their wages, and called on its sympathizers to side with the Aborigines Progressive Association.

Ban
With the outbreak of the Second World War in 1939, the Australian communist press was confronted with increasing censorship issues. On 27 May 1940 the newspaper was banned. The newspaper was published illegally between June 1940 and 8 January 1943. During this time its size was reduced.

Later period
The last issue of The North Queensland Guardian was published on 5 November 1943. It was superseded by The Queensland Guardian, published from Brisbane.

References

1937 establishments in Australia
1943 disestablishments in Australia
English-language communist newspapers
Defunct newspapers published in Queensland
Townsville